The Valley of Saints is located in Khuldabad, a town in the Aurangabad district of Maharashtra, India. Several Sufi saints of the Chishti Order chose to reside in Khuldabad in the fourteenth century. The dargah of Muntajib al-Din (Khuldabad), and the tomb of  the last great Mughal emperor Aurangzeb are located here.  Muntajib al-Din, known best by his epithet Zar Zari Zar Baksh,  migrated to this area in the 14th century at the request of his teacher, Nizamuddin Auliya of Delhi.

See also
Sufi Saints of Aurangabad
Khuldabad
Khwaja Zainuddin Shirazi
Sayyid Burhan-ud-din
Ganj Rawan Ganj Baksh
Zar Zari Zar Baksh

References

Aurangabad, Maharashtra
Ziyarat
Tourist attractions in Maharashtra
Indian Sufi saints